Puls 4 is a terrestrial television channel in Austria. As its name implies, it is the fourth Austrian-wide full-service television channel, behind ORF eins, ORF 2, and ATV.

History
Puls 4 began as a local Vienna television station called "Puls TV". In 2007, ProSiebenSat.1 Media took over the station outright. On 28 January 2008, with the addition of a nightly newscast, the station relaunched as "Puls 4", Austria's fourth general terrestrial network.

Programming

Original
Austria's Next Topmodel
The Masked Singer Austria

Imported
America's Next Top Model
Miss Earth

Series 

1600 Penn (2017)
The 4400 (2008, 2010)
Bis in die Spitzen, German version of Cutting It (2010)
Cagney & Lacey (2010)
Criminal Minds: Suspect Behavior (Criminal Minds: Team Red) (2014-2016)
CSI: Crime Scene Investigation (2011-2014)
CSI: Miami (2008–present)
CSI: NY (2012-2016)
Dawson's Creek (2009)
Diagnosis: Murder (Diagnose: Mord) (2008-2016)
Edel & Starck (2008, 2010)
Chavez Animiert, German dub of El Chavo Animado (2008-2011)
Fringe (Fringe - Grenzfälle des FBI) (2010-2012)
Highway to Heaven (Ein Engel auf Erden) (2008-2016)
King (2013-2014)
Law & Order
Law & Order: SVU
Magnum, P.I. (Magnum) (2009-2010)
Miami Vice (2009-2010)
Murder, She Wrote (Mord ist ihr Hobby) (2009-2017)
Numb3rs (Numb3rs - Die Logik des Verbrechens) (2008-2013, 2016)
Royal Pains (2011-2014)
Terra Nova (2012)
The Guardian (The Guardian - Retter mit Herz) (2008-2010)
The Shield (The Shield - Gesetz der Gewalt) (2008-2010)
The Wonder Years (Wunderbare Jahre) (2013-2014)

Sports 

 UEFA Europa League
 UEFA Youth League
 NFL

Logos

References

External links
 

Television stations in Austria
Television channels and stations established in 2004
ProSiebenSat.1 Media
Mass media in Vienna
2004 establishments in Austria